Ledderhose may refer to:

 Georg Ledderhose (1855–1925), a German surgeon
 Plantar fibromatosis, also known as Ledderhose's disease

See also
 Lederhosen